, also known as  was the fifth legendary emperor of Japan, according to the traditional order of succession. Very little is known about this Emperor due to a lack of material available for further verification and study. Kōshō is known as a "legendary emperor" among historians as his actual existence is disputed. Nothing exists in the Kojiki other than his name and genealogy. Kōshō's reign allegedly began in 475 BC, he had one wife and two sons. After his death in 393 BC, his second son supposedly became the next emperor.

Legendary narrative
In the Kojiki and Nihon Shoki, only his name and genealogy were recorded. The Japanese have traditionally accepted this sovereign's historical existence, and an Imperial misasagi(陵) or tomb for Kōshō is currently maintained; however, no extant contemporary records have been discovered that confirm a view that this historical figure actually reigned. Kōshō is believed to be the oldest son of Emperor Itoku, and his wife Amanotoyototsu-hime. His mother was the daughter of Okishimimi-no-kami. Kōshō allegedly had a wife named Yosotarashi-hime, and fathered two children with her. His reign lasted from 475 BC until his death in 393 BC, his second son then took the throne and would later be referred to as Emperor Kōan.

Known information
The existence of at least the first nine Emperors is disputed due to insufficient material available for further verification and study. Kōshō is thus regarded by historians as a "legendary Emperor", and is considered to have been the fourth of eight Emperors without specific legends associated with them. The name Kōshō-tennō was assigned to him posthumously by later generations, and literally means "filial manifestation". His name might have been regularized centuries after the lifetime ascribed to Kōshō, possibly during the time in which legends about the origins of the Yamato dynasty were compiled as the chronicles known today as the Kojiki. While the actual site of Kōshō's grave is not known, the Emperor is traditionally venerated at a memorial Shinto shrine (misasagi) in Gose. The Imperial Household Agency designates this location as Kōshō's mausoleum. It is formally named Waki-no-kami no Hakata no yama no e no misasagi. There is a possibility that this figure could have lived instead in the 1st century (AD), however more research is needed to make any further conclusions.

The first emperor that historians state might have actually existed is Emperor Sujin, the 10th emperor of Japan. Outside of the Kojiki, the reign of Emperor Kinmei ( – 571 AD) is the first for which contemporary historiography is able to assign verifiable dates. The conventionally accepted names and dates of the early Emperors were not confirmed as "traditional" though, until the reign of Emperor Kanmu between 737 and 806 AD.

Consorts and Children
Empress: , Owari clan's daughter
 
 , later Emperor Kōan

See also
 Emperor of Japan
 List of Emperors of Japan
 Imperial cult

Notes

References

Further reading
 Aston, William George. (1896).  Nihongi: Chronicles of Japan from the Earliest Times to A.D. 697. London: Kegan Paul, Trench, Trubner.  
 Brown, Delmer M. and Ichirō Ishida, eds. (1979).  Gukanshō: The Future and the Past. Berkeley: University of California Press. ;  
 Chamberlain, Basil Hall. (1920). The Kojiki. Read before the Asiatic Society of Japan on April 12, May 10, and June 21, 1882; reprinted, May, 1919.  
 Nussbaum, Louis-Frédéric and Käthe Roth. (2005).  Japan encyclopedia. Cambridge: Harvard University Press. ;  
 Ponsonby-Fane, Richard Arthur Brabazon. (1959).  The Imperial House of Japan. Kyoto: Ponsonby Memorial Society. 
 Titsingh, Isaac. (1834). Nihon Ōdai Ichiran; ou,  Annales des empereurs du Japon.  Paris: Royal Asiatic Society, Oriental Translation Fund of Great Britain and Ireland.  
 Varley, H. Paul. (1980).  Jinnō Shōtōki: A Chronicle of Gods and Sovereigns. New York: Columbia University Press. ;  

 
 

Legendary Emperors of Japan
People of Jōmon-period Japan
People of Yayoi-period Japan